Palatka High School is a public high school located in Palatka, Florida, operated by the Putnam County School Board. The school was established 1977 after merging two existing schools - Palatka Central and Palatka South. The campus has completed several renovation projects with science labs, new classrooms, a performing arts area, and office areas. Palatka High School serves the Palatka and East Palatka areas. Current student enrollment is about 1,400, drawing students from Jenkins Middle School.
Students attend 7 classes per day, taking a wide variety of courses, including dual enrollment courses at St. Johns River State College. PHS offers Honors and AP courses and a variety of elective classes including Art and Journalism. Florida Virtual School is also an option for students.

Notable alumni
 Greg Mullins, professional baseball player (Milwaukee Brewers)
 Bill Swaggerty, professional baseball player (Baltimore Orioles)
 Michelle McCool, WWE Wrestler, WWE Divas Champion
 Willie Offord, NFL defensive back (Minnesota Vikings)
 Charles Smith, American football player
 John L. Williams, NFL running back (Seattle Seahawks) (Pittsburgh Steelers)
 Jarvis Williams, NFL safety (Miami Dolphins) (New York Giants)
 John Crawford, New York Times Bestselling author
Bryan Jacob, bantam- and featherweight weightlifter who competed at the 1992 and 1996 Olympics

References

High schools in Putnam County, Florida
Educational institutions established in 1977
Public high schools in Florida
1977 establishments in Florida